Bricklayer's Arms is a 1945 detective novel by John Rhode, the pen name of the British writer Cecil Street. It is the forty first in his long-running series of novels featuring Lancelot Priestley, a Golden Age armchair detective.   It was published in America by Dodd Mead under the alternative title Shadow of a Crime. It was particularly notable for the lesser role played by Priestley, with the case being solved largely by Inspector Waghorn of Scotland Yard alone.

Synopsis
A local village deliveryman comes across the body of an estate agent near a railway bridge, apparently the victim of a motorcycle accident. Subsequent investigation reveals he was killed and suspicion turns towards the dead man's boss. A mysterious bricklayer seen in the vicinity may also have some vital clue to solve the case.

References

Bibliography
 Herbert, Rosemary. Whodunit?: A Who's Who in Crime & Mystery Writing. Oxford University Press, 2003.
 Magill, Frank Northen . Critical Survey of Mystery and Detective Fiction: Authors, Volume 4. Salem Press, 1988.
 Reilly, John M. Twentieth Century Crime & Mystery Writers. Springer, 2015.

1945 British novels
Novels by Cecil Street
British crime novels
British mystery novels
British thriller novels
British detective novels
Collins Crime Club books
Novels set in England